Albert Kotin (August 7, 1907 – February 6, 1980) belonged to the early generation of New York School Abstract Expressionist artists whose artistic innovation by the 1950s had been recognized across the Atlantic, including in Paris. The New York School Abstract Expressionism, represented by Jackson Pollock, Willem de Kooning, Franz Kline, and others became a leading art movement of the post-World War II era.

Biography
Albert Kotin was born August 7, 1907, in Minsk, Russian Empire and emigrated to the US in 1908. He became a US citizen in 1923.

Kotin studied: (1924–1929) at the National Academy of Design, New York City; with Charles Hawthorne, Provincetown, Massachusetts; (1929–32) at the Académie Julian, the Académie de la Grande Chaumière and at the  Atelier de Fresque and the Académie Colarossi, Paris, France;
(1947–1951) at The Art Students League of New York, New York City; under the GI Bill he went to study with Hans Hofmann in Provincetown and in New York City.

He participated in the Federal Art Project: Public Works of Art Project (PWAP) (1933–34) and Works Progress Administration/Federal Art Project (WPA/FAP) (1935–40). 
Kotin won competitions that were funded through commissions under the Treasury Department's Section of Painting and Sculpture (later known as The Section of Fine Arts) in Ada, Ohio, and in Arlington, New Jersey. He completed two WPA murals, The City and The Marsh for the Kearney, New Jersey, post office in 1938.

Kotin served in the U.S. Army military service during World War II (1941–1945).

After the war Kotin found a studio on 10th Street. He soon joined the "Downtown Group" which represented a group of artists who found studios in lower Manhattan in the area bounded by 8th and 12th street between First and Sixth Avenues during the late 1940s and early 1950s. These artists were called the "Downtown Group" as opposed to the "Uptown Group" established during the war at The Art of This Century Gallery. 
In 1949 Kotin joined the "Artists' Club" located at 39 East 8th Street.
Albert Kotin was chosen by his fellow artists to show in the Ninth Street Show held on May 21 – June 10, 1951.   
The show was located at 60 East 9th Street on the first floor and the basement of a building which was about to be demolished. 
"The artists celebrated not only the appearance of the dealers, collectors and museum people on the 9th Street, and the consequent exposure of their work but they celebrated the creation and the strength of a living community of significant dimensions."

Kotin participated in all the invitational New York Painting and Sculpture Annuals. The first annual in 1951 was called the Ninth Street Show. From 1953  to 1957  the invitational New York Painting and Sculpture Annuals were held in the Stable Gallery on West 58th Street in New York City. He was among the 24 out of a total 256 New York School artists who was included in all the Annuals. These Annuals were important because the participants were chosen by the artists themselves.
Harold Rosenberg, New York art critic listed Albert Kotin among the "Tenth Street Artists: Individuals Prevail over the Group:"  Kotin was exhibited by the Anita Shapolsky Gallery in New York City, McCormick Gallery, and Robert Miller Gallery-New York.

Kotin was also a poet who inspired his fellow artists. Alexander Calder wrote in 1968, "As long as there are people such as Al Kotin, there is no danger to art."

Kotin died on February 6, 1980, in New York City from lung cancer.

Selected solo exhibitions
 1951: (first) Hacker Gallery, New York City;
1958: Grand Central Moderns Gallery, New York City;
1959: Tanager Gallery, New York City;
1960: Galerie Iris Clert, Paris, France;  Pollock Gallery, Toronto, Canada;
1961: Mili-Jay Gallery, Woodstock, New York;
1964, 1965  : Byron Gallery, New York City;
1968: "Ten Year Retrospective of Albert Kotin's Work", Long Island University; Brooklyn, New York; "Kotin and Carton", Art Faculty two man show, Long Island University, Brooklyn;
1982: "Albert Kotin, 1907–1980", Memorial Exhibition, Barron Arts Center, Woodbridge, New Jersey.

Selected group exhibitions
1935: "Exhibition of Oil Paintings", WPA Federal Art Project, Federal Art Gallery, New York City;
1936: An American Group, Inc., New York City;
1946: "First National Print Competition Exhibit", Associated American Artists, New York City;
1947: "J & E.R. Pennell Exhibition of Prints", Library of Congress, Washington, D.C.;
1948: "46th Annual Exhibition", The Pennsylvania Academy of the Fine Arts, Philadelphia;
1949: "8 & 2 Exhibition" The New School for Social Research, New York City;
1951: ‘’’Ninth Street Show’’’, the first "New York Painting and Sculpture Annual", New York City;
1953, 1954, 1955, 1956, 1957: "New York Painting and Sculpture Annual", Stable Gallery, New York City;
1956: "Painters and Sculptors on 10th Street", Tanager Gallery, New York City;
1957: "First Spring Annual Exhibition", March Gallery, New York City;
1958: "A to Z in American Arts", Provincetown Arts Festival, M. Knoedler & Co., New York City; Camino Gallery, New York City;
1959: "10th Street", Contemporary Arts Museum, Houston, Texas;
1960: "New York Artists: A Drawing Show", Southern Illinois University, Carbondale, Illinois; Galerie Iris Clert, Paris, France; Pollock Gallery, Toronto, Canada;
1960–61: Mili-Jay Gallery, Woodstock, New York;
1961: Allyn Gallery, St. Louis, Missouri;
1962, 1972: Long Island University, Brooklyn, New York;
1963: "Multiples", Graham Gallery, New York City, New York; Key Gallery, New York City;
1963–64: "Hans Hofmann and His Students", circ. by the Museum of Modern Art, New York City;
1963, 1964: Aegis Gallery, New York City;
1965: "79 painters who paint", held simultaneously in: Grace Borgenicht, Graham, Martha Jackson, Kornblee and Poindexter Galleries, New York City;
1966: "New York '66", College Museum, Hampton Institute, Hampton, Virginia;
1971: Roko Gallery, New York City;
1994: "Reclaiming Artists of the New York School. Toward a More Inclusive View of  the 1950s", Baruch College City University, New York City; "New York-Provincetown: A 50s Connection", Provincetown Art Association and Museum, Provincetown, Massachusetts;
2004: "Reuniting an Era Abstract Expressionists of the 1950s.", Rockford Art Museum, Rockford, Illinois.

See also

Art movement
Ninth Street Show
New York School
Action painting
Abstract expressionism
Expressionism
American Figurative Expressionism

References

 Abstract expressionist art movement in America video documentation project, 1991–1992.
 Smithsonian Institution Research Information System; Archival, Manuscript and Photographic Collections, Albert Kotin

Catalogs which include Albert Kotin
 It is; a magazine for abstract art No. 4, Autumn 1959, New York City
 10th Street The Contemporary Arts Museum Houston, Texas October 15 – November 8, 1959
Albert Kotin Byron Gallery, Inc. New York City, April 7–25, 1964
Albert Kotin 1907–1980 Memorial Exhibition Long Island University, The Brooklyn Center, Brooklyn, New York. October 6–29, 1982
Albert Kotin Retrospective: Paintings, Drawings, Prints Artfull Eye Exhibition Gallery, Lambertville, New Jersey. October 30 – November 20, 1988
 Mishkin Gallery Reclaiming Artists of the New York School Toward a More Inclusive view of the 1950s Baruch College CUNY March 18 – April 22, 1994
  Provicetown Art Association Hans Hofmann, New York-Provincetown: A 50s Connection Provincetown Art Association and Museum, Provincetown, Massachusetts July 8 – August 1, 1994
  Rockford Art Museum Reuniting an Era abstract expressionists of the 1950s Rockford Art Museum, Rockford, Illinois November 12, 2004 – January 25, 2005

Books
 Marika Herskovic, American Abstract and Figurative Expressionism: Style Is Timely Art Is Timeless (New York School Press, 2009.) . pp. 140–143
 Marika Herskovic, American Abstract Expressionism of the 1950s An Illustrated Survey, (New York School Press, 2003.) . pp. 190–193
 Marika Herskovic, New York School Abstract Expressionists Artists Choice by Artists, (New York School Press, 2000.) . p. 16; p. 37; pp. 206–209
 Marika Herskovic, Albert Kotin American Abstract Expressionist of the 1950s (New York School Press, 2016.)

External links
 Selected works of art by Albert Kotin 
 Publications including Albert Kotin 
—14:14min video

1907 births
1980 deaths
Abstract expressionist artists
Expressionist painters
20th-century American painters
American male painters
United States Army personnel of World War II
Modern painters
Painters from New York City
Art Students League of New York alumni
Académie Colarossi alumni
Federal Art Project artists
Public Works of Art Project artists
Alumni of the Académie de la Grande Chaumière
Section of Painting and Sculpture artists
20th-century American printmakers
Deaths from lung cancer in New York (state)
Emigrants from the Russian Empire to the United States
20th-century American male artists